Beauty and the Beast: Live on Stage is a Broadway-style musical at the Theater of the Stars, on Sunset Boulevard, at Disney's Hollywood Studios, Walt Disney World. It is based on the 1991 animated film Beauty and the Beast and opened on November 22, 1991, the same day the film was released. While most of the soundtrack is pre-recorded, the actors playing Belle and Gaston are the only two that have live dialogue and singing parts. Two versions of the show have been presented since opening day. Because of the COVID-19 pandemic, on August 2, 2020 it was replaced for two months by a new show, Disney Society Orchestra and Friends. On August 15, 2021, the Beauty and the Beast show reopened, with some modifications to the staging and choreography to account for the health and safety of the performers.

Summary
The original version opened on November 22, 1991, the same day the film was released. When the Theater of the Stars was moved in September 1993 (to make room for the construction of Sunset Boulevard), the show was temporarily moved to the Premiere Theater on New York Street. The show reopened in July 1994, in the now-covered and newly rebuilt Theater of the Stars on Sunset Boulevard.

The stage show changed considerably from the original version to the currently running version, causing it to more closely resemble the 1991 film of the same name. However, because the show is condensed to approximately 25 minutes, many cuts and edits are made.

The show opens like the Broadway musical. An old beggar woman asks a spoiled and selfish prince if he will allow her to stay in his castle for the night from the bitter cold, in exchange for a single rose; to which the prince turns her away. Because his heart is cold, the old beggar woman turns into a beautiful enchantress who punishes the prince by transforming him in to an ugly, scary, and hideous Beast. Everyone in the castle gets a punishing transformation as well. The prince can only break the spell by learning to love another, and earning their love in return, and failure to do so will cause him to "remain a beast for all time".

Years later, Belle is walking in the quiet little French village where she lives. The other villagers agree that Belle is beautiful, but she is also no ordinary character. Gaston, the handsome young hunter of the town, boasts how he loves Belle and asks her to marry him ("Belle"/"Gaston") and she politely refuses. Soon though, "under a series of mysterious circumstances", Belle finds herself inside the Beast's enchanted castle. She is confronted by the magical castle inhabitants, Cogsworth the clock, Lumiere the candelabra, Mrs. Potts the teapot, and her son, Chip the teacup. Cogsworth thinks that they made a mistake by allowing Belle inside, but the others believe she could be the one to break the curse. So they throw her a feast and, simultaneously invite her to dinner ("Be Our Guest"). The Beast abruptly ends the celebration and expresses his fear that Belle could never learn to love him. Belle, on a tour through the castle, enters the West Wing and discovers the rose. The Beast is furious at Belle, because he told her never to enter that part of the castle. All of this causes Belle and the Beast to argue. But the others advise Beast to be a gentleman, because Belle could be the one to break the curse. The castle's inhabitants discover that there could be a romance not seen before in Beast ("Something There"), and the two fall in love.

Meanwhile, Gaston declares that Belle has rejected him for the last time. He convinces the villagers that the Beast is a monster, and the village is not safe until he is dead. So they decide to kill him ("The Mob Song"). The townspeople take over the castle, ruining everything in sight. Gaston fights the Beast, and Belle appears just to see Gaston make his final blow. Seeing the Beast nearly dead, Belle admits she loves him just as the rose's last petal falls. This breaks the curse, and the Beast is magically transformed back into the Prince. The entire cast returns for a final dance, and declare that the love of "Beauty and the Beast" will thrive forever. Instantly, Belle and the prince reappear in their traditional costumes ("Beauty and the Beast"). At the curtain call, Belle and the Prince give away a rose to an audience member.

Setlist

Original (1991–2001)
"Be Our Guest"
"Belle"/"Gaston"
"Something There" 
"The Mob Song"
"Beauty and the Beast"

Current (2001–present)
The second version of the show debuted in March 2001 and features the songs arranged in a similar order in which they are presented in the film. It is currently the longest-running stage show at any Disney theme park.
"Prologue: The Enchantress"
"Belle"/"Gaston"
"Belle (Reprise)"
"Be Our Guest"
"Something There"
"The Mob Song"
"Beauty and the Beast"
"Beauty and the Beast", performed by Celine Dion and Peabo Bryson (exit music)

Television appearances
 The show was featured on The Oprah Winfrey Show, when Oprah went to Disney World, with a performance of "Beauty and the Beast" by Celine Dion and Peabo Bryson. Characters such as Belle, The Prince, Chip, Mrs. Potts, Lumiere and Cogsworth also appeared.
 Excerpts from the show were shown during the Walt Disney World Christmas Day Parade in 1991, when the show first premiered.
 The cast appeared on the Walt Disney World Christmas Day Parade in 2005, featuring John O'Hurley singing "Be Our Guest" with the cast.

List of handprints in forecourt

2020 labor dispute
When Walt Disney World reopened in July 2020 following the COVID-19 shutdown, all stage shows such as Finding Nemo – The Musical, Beauty and the Beast Live on Stage, Festival of the Lion King, and the Indiana Jones Epic Stunt Spectacular! remained closed due to a dispute between the Actors' Equity Association and Walt Disney World over allowing performers to wear face masks and providing regular testing.

References

External links
Official website
Walt Disney World Resort - Beauty and the Beast - Live on Stage
1991 Beauty and the Beast TV segment from Walt Disney World Christmas Day Parade

Live On Stage
Walt Disney Parks and Resorts entertainment
Disney's Hollywood Studios
Disney Cruise Line
Fantasyland
Tomorrowland
Sunset Boulevard (Disney's Hollywood Studios)
Walt Disney Parks and Resorts attractions
Amusement park attractions introduced in 1991
Amusement park attractions introduced in 1992
Amusement park attractions that closed in 1995
Amusement park attractions that closed in 1996
Amusement park attractions introduced in 2017
1991 establishments in Florida
Musicals based on films
Musicals based on multiple works